Tingena morosa is a species of moth in the family Oecophoridae. It is endemic to New Zealand and has been found in the South Island in Nelson including at the Dun Mountain and in the Canterbury region. This species inhabits native forest at altitudes from 2000 to 3000 ft. Adults of this species are on the wing in December.

Taxonomy 
This species was first described by Alfred Philpott using specimens collected in Nelson and at Dun Mountain. Philpott originally named the species Borkhausenia morosa. George Hudson discussed this species in his 1928 book The butterflies and moths of New Zealand under that name. In 1988 J. S. Dugdale placed this species in the genus Tingena. The male holotype specimen, collected at Dun Mountain, is held in the New Zealand Arthropod Collection.

Description
Philpott described this species as follows:

Distribution
This species is endemic to New Zealand and has been observed in the Nelson region, at Dun Mountain, and in the Canterbury region.

Behaviour 
Adults of this species are on the wing in December.

Habitat 
This species inhabits native forest at altitudes from 2000 to 3000 ft.

References

Oecophoridae
Moths of New Zealand
Moths described in 1926
Endemic fauna of New Zealand
Taxa named by Alfred Philpott
Endemic moths of New Zealand